Samuel Eilenberg (September 30, 1913 – January 30, 1998) was a Polish-American mathematician who co-founded category theory (with Saunders Mac Lane) and homological algebra.

Early life and education
He was born in Warsaw, Kingdom of Poland to a Jewish family. He spent much of his career as a professor at Columbia University.

He earned his Ph.D. from University of Warsaw in 1936, with thesis On the Topological Applications of Maps onto a Circle; his thesis advisors were Kazimierz Kuratowski and Karol Borsuk. He died in New York City in January 1998.

Career
Eilenberg's main body of work was in algebraic topology. He worked on the axiomatic treatment of homology theory with Norman Steenrod (and the Eilenberg–Steenrod axioms are named for the pair), and on homological algebra with Saunders Mac Lane. In the process, Eilenberg and Mac Lane created category theory.

Eilenberg was a member of Bourbaki and, with Henri Cartan, wrote the 1956 book Homological Algebra.

Later in life he worked mainly in pure category theory, being one of the founders of the field. The Eilenberg swindle (or telescope) is a construction applying the telescoping cancellation idea to projective modules.

Eilenberg contributed to automata theory and algebraic automata theory. In particular, he introduced a model of computation called X-machine and a new prime decomposition algorithm for finite state machines in the vein of Krohn–Rhodes theory.

Art collection
Eilenberg was also a prominent collector of Asian art. His collection mainly consisted of small sculptures and other artifacts from India, Indonesia, Nepal, Thailand, Cambodia, Sri Lanka and Central Asia. In 1991–1992, the Metropolitan Museum of Art in New York staged an exhibition from more than 400 items that Eilenberg had donated to the museum, entitled The Lotus Transcendent: Indian and Southeast Asian Art From the Samuel Eilenberg Collection. In reciprocity, the Metropolitan Museum of Art donated substantially to the endowment of the Samuel Eilenberg Visiting Professorship in Mathematics at Columbia University.

Selected publications

See also
Stefan Banach
Stanislaw Ulam
Eilenberg–Montgomery fixed point theorem

Footnotes

External links

 Eilenberg's biography − from the National Academies Press, by Hyman Bass, Henri Cartan, Peter Freyd, Alex Heller and Saunders Mac Lane.

1913 births
1998 deaths
20th-century American mathematicians
Category theorists
Columbia University faculty
Nicolas Bourbaki
Scientists from New York City
Warsaw School of Mathematics
People from Warsaw Governorate
Polish emigrants to the United States
19th-century Polish Jews
Topologists
University of Warsaw alumni
Wolf Prize in Mathematics laureates
Members of the United States National Academy of Sciences
Mathematicians from New York (state)